Deportivo JBL del Zulia, is a professional football club based in Maracaibo, Zulia, Venezuela. They play at the Estadio José Pachencho Romero.

References

External links
Official Site

Association football clubs established in 2013
Deportivo JBL del Zulia
Sport in Maracaibo
2013 establishments in Venezuela